Serendipity Sapphire is the world's largest star sapphire cluster. It weighs . It was found in Kahawatte in the Ratnapura District, Sri Lanka, in July 2021. Its  worth is estimated to be up to US$100 million.

See also 
The Star of Adam, largest star sapphire in the world
Queen of Asia (gem), largest blue sapphire
List of individual gemstones
List of sapphires by size

References 

Individual sapphires
Gems of Sri Lanka